Mark Samuel Roye Gayle (born 21 October 1969) is a former professional footballer who made 193 appearances as a goalkeeper in the English Football League. After his playing career finished, he coached at clubs including Leamington.

References

External links

1969 births
Living people
English footballers
Blackpool F.C. players
Worcester City F.C. players
Walsall F.C. players
Cheltenham Town F.C. players
Crewe Alexandra F.C. players
Liverpool F.C. players
Birmingham City F.C. players
Hereford United F.C. players
Chesterfield F.C. players
Luton Town F.C. players
Rushden & Diamonds F.C. players
Hednesford Town F.C. players
Solihull Borough F.C. players
Halesowen Town F.C. players
Tamworth F.C. players
Rushall Olympic F.C. players
Association football goalkeepers
Sportspeople from Bromsgrove